The Asian Women's Volleyball Championship is an international volleyball competition in Asia and Oceania contested by the senior women's national teams of the members of Asian Volleyball Confederation (AVC), the sport's continent governing body. The initial gap between championships was four years, but since 1987 they have been awarded every two years. The current champion is Japan, which won its fifth title in 2019.

The 20 Asian Championship tournaments have been won by three different national teams. China have won thirteen times. The other Asian Championship winners are Japan, with five titles; and Thailand with two titles.

The 2021 edition has been canceled due to COVID-19 pandemic. The 2023 edition will be held in Nakhon Ratchasima, Thailand.

Results summary

Teams reaching the top four

Champions by region

Hosts
List of hosts by number of championships hosted.

Medal summary

Participating nations
Legend
 – Champions
 – Runners-up
 – Third place
 – Fourth place
 – Did not enter / Did not qualify
 – Hosts
Q – Qualified for forthcoming tournament

Debut of teams

MVP by edition
1975–2001 – Not awarded
2003 – 
2005 – 
2007 – 
2009 – 
2011 – 
2013 – 
2015 – 
2017 – 
2019 – 
2023 –

See also
 Asian Men's Volleyball Championship
 Volleyball at the Asian Games
 Asian Women's Volleyball Cup
 Asian Women's U23 Volleyball Championship
 Asian Women's U19 Volleyball Championship
 Asian Girls' U18 Volleyball Championship

References
 Sports123.com

External links
 Asian Volleyball Confederation – official website

 

V
Volleyball
International volleyball competitions
International women's volleyball competitions
Volleyball competitions in Asia
Biennial sporting events
Asian Volleyball Confederation competitions